is a Japanese mathematician at Kyoto University specializing in algebraic geometry.

Work
He introduced the Fourier–Mukai transform in 1981 in a paper on abelian varieties, which also made up his doctoral thesis. His research since has included work on vector bundles on K3 surfaces, three-dimensional Fano varieties, moduli theory, and non-commutative Brill-Noether theory. He also found a new counterexample to Hilbert's 14th problem (the first counterexample was found by Nagata in 1959).

Publications

References

External links
 
 

1953 births
20th-century Japanese mathematicians
21st-century Japanese mathematicians
Algebraic geometers
Kyoto University alumni
Academic staff of Kyoto University
Living people
Academic staff of Nagoya University